James H. Holstein (September 24, 1930 – December 16, 2007) was an American professional basketball player.

A 6'3" forward/guard from the University of Cincinnati, where he was a consensus All-American, Holstein played four seasons (1952–1956) in the National Basketball Association as a member of the Minneapolis Lakers and Fort Wayne Pistons.  He averaged 3.8 points per game and won 3 NBA championships with the Lakers.

Following his NBA career, Holstein was a college basketball coach; he spent 11 seasons at Saint Joseph's College in Rennsalear, Indiana. He left Saint Joseph's to assume the head coaching job at Ball State University. Holstein's final coaching stop was as head coach at the University of St. Francis in Ft. Wayne, IN from 1978–1993.

References

External links

Jim Holstein's obituary at NBA.com

1930 births
2007 deaths
American men's basketball coaches
American men's basketball players
Ball State Cardinals men's basketball coaches
Basketball coaches from Ohio
Basketball players from Ohio
Cincinnati Bearcats men's basketball players
College men's basketball head coaches in the United States
Fort Wayne Pistons players
Minneapolis Lakers draft picks
Minneapolis Lakers players
Saint Joseph's Pumas baseball coaches
Saint Joseph's Pumas football coaches
Saint Joseph's Pumas men's basketball coaches
Small forwards
Sportspeople from Hamilton, Ohio